The Daniels College of Business is one of twelve graduate programs at the University of Denver.  Founded in 1908, the Daniels College of Business is the eighth oldest business school in the United States.  Daniels currently enrolls approximately 2,293 students, divided between graduate, undergraduate programs, and dual undergraduate/graduate programs.

Online MBA program 
The Daniels College of Business is one of the first business schools established in the U.S., and has been continuously accredited by the AACSB since 1923.

Rankings
Among the approximately 643 business schools accredited by the Association to Advance Collegiate Schools of Business (AACSB), Daniels is in the top 15% of undergraduate programs and the top 5% of graduate programs.
Daniels was ranked #5 regionally and 25th nationally in 2011 by Business Week  for its part-time MBA programs. Its undergraduate business program was ranked 57th in the county and #1 in Colorado.
 #72 among Best Undergraduate Business Programs by U.S. News & World Report

The Financial Times ranked Daniels #35 in the United States, among Executive MBA programs for 2011.

References

External links
 Official website

Business schools in Colorado
University of Denver
1908 establishments in Colorado